Dragan Tadić (born 12 February 1973) is a Croatian retired football midfielder who was most recently the manager of Croatian club Rijeka.

Career
He had spent the peak years of his career playing for various clubs in Croatia’s Prva HNL, including close to 200 official games for HNK Rijeka. He played the 1996 UEFA Intertoto Cup with Segesta where they lost in the final to Danish club Silkeborg IF.
Abroad he played in Belgium with KRC Harelbeke.

Club statistics

Managerial statistics

Honours
Rijeka
Croatian Cup: 2004-05, 2005-06

Zadar
2.HNL Promotion: 2006-07

Istra 1961
2.HNL: 2008-09

References

External links
 

1973 births
Living people
Footballers from Rijeka
Association football midfielders
Yugoslav footballers
Croatian footballers
HNK Rijeka players
FC Koper players
NK Primorje players
NK Istra players
HNK Segesta players
K.R.C. Zuid-West-Vlaanderen players
NK Zadar players
NK Novalja players
NK Istra 1961 players
Yugoslav First League players
Croatian Football League players
Belgian Pro League players
First Football League (Croatia) players
Second Football League (Croatia) players
Croatian expatriate footballers
Expatriate footballers in Belgium
Croatian expatriate sportspeople in Belgium
Croatian football managers
NK Hrvatski Dragovoljac managers
HNK Rijeka managers
Croatian Football League managers
HNK Rijeka non-playing staff